Lubna Agha (May 2, 1949 - May 6, 2012) was an American artist of Pakistani descent who lived in Brookline, Massachusetts.

Her work has been exhibited in art museums and galleries in Pakistan and the United States, as well as Britain, Japan, Jordan, and Switzerland. Her paintings are part of the permanent collections at the Asian Collection at Bradford Museum, UK, National Council of the Arts, Pakistan, and the Jordan National Gallery of Fine Arts, Jordan.

The Karachi School of Arts dedicated an Art Gallery to her name. The Lubna Agha Art Gallery was inaugurated with a showing of her work and a memorial lecture in March, 2016.

A book about the artist by Marcella Nessom Sirhandi entitled Lubna Agha: Points of Reference was published by The Foundation of Museum of Modern Art, Pakistan in 2007.

Death
Agha died of complications from gallbladder cancer at her home in Brookline, Massachusetts on May 6, 2012. She was 63 years old.

Individual exhibitions 

 2016 Inaugural Exhibition: Lubna Agha Art Gallery, Karachi School of Arts, Karachi, Pakistan
 2016 "A Path All My Own" - Retrospective Exhibition: VM Art Gallery, Karachi, Pakistan
 2012 Points of Reference: Paintings Cite Islamic Visual Legacy: Gardiner Art Gallery, Stillwater, OK
 2007 International Visions Gallery, Washington DC
 2001 Chawkandi Gallery, Karachi, Pakistan
 1996 Chawkandi Gallery, Karachi, Pakistan
 1991 Himovitz Solomon Gallery, Sacramento, California
 1987 Indus Gallery, Karachi, Pakistan
 1985 Djurovich Gallery, Sacramento, California
 1983 Rara Avis, Sacramento, California
 1981 Alta Galleries, Sacramento, California
 1981 Stuart/Scott Gallery, Fair Oaks, California
 1980 Indus Gallery, Karachi, Pakistan
 1976 Contemporary Art Gallery, Rawalpindi, Pakistan
 1975 Pakistan Art Gallery, Lahore, Pakistan
 1973 Indus Gallery, Karachi, Pakistan
 1972 Contemporary Art Gallery, Rawalpindi, Pakistan
 1971 Arts Council of Pakistan, Karachi, Pakistan
 1969 Pakistan American Cultural Centre, Karachi, Pakistan

References

 Contemporary Painting in Pakistan by Dr. Marcella Nessom Sirhandi
 Painters of Pakistan by Amjad Ali
 Image and Identity: 50 Years of Painting and Sculpture in Pakistan by Akbar Naqvi
 Unveiling the Veiled by Salima Hashmi
 Painting in Pakistan by Ejazul Hasan

External links
 Artist's website
 

American contemporary artists
Muslim artists
Modern artists
Pakistani painters
2012 deaths
People from Brookline, Massachusetts
American artists of Pakistani descent
Pakistani art collectors
1949 births
Deaths from gallbladder cancer
Deaths from cancer in Massachusetts